S. J. Munasinghe was the 33rd Surveyor General of Sri Lanka. He was appointed in 1973, succeeding A. M. Cumaraswamy, and held the office until 1981. He was succeeded by S. D. F. C. Nanayakkara.

References

M